Frank David may refer to:

 Frank David (wrestler), a ring name of Irish wrestler Jordan Devlin
 Franck David, a French windsurfer
 , a French actor